Segavi (also Romanized as Segāvī and Sagavī; also known as Sakāvī and Sekāvī) is a village in Miyan Rud Rural District, Qolqol Rud District, Tuyserkan County, Hamadan Province, Iran. At the 2006 census, its population was 261, in 72 families.

References 

Populated places in Tuyserkan County